John Tlale (born 15 May 1967) is a South African former footballer who played at both professional and international levels as a goalkeeper. Tlale played club football for Bloemfontein Celtic, Welkom Stars, Mamelodi Sundowns and Spartak Pretoria; he also earned eight caps for the South African national side between 1999 and 2002 and was part of the squad that won the 1996 African Cup of Nations.

References

External links

1967 births
Living people
People from Kroonstad
Africa Cup of Nations-winning players
South African soccer players
South Africa international soccer players
1996 African Cup of Nations players
1998 African Cup of Nations players
2000 African Cup of Nations players
Bloemfontein Celtic F.C. players
Mamelodi Sundowns F.C. players
Association football goalkeepers
South African soccer managers